Hulgewadi is a village in the Karmala taluka of Solapur district in Maharashtra state, India.

Demographics
Covering  and comprising 98 households at the time of the 2011 census of India, Hulgewadi had a population of 429. There were 222 males and 207 females, with 55 people being aged six or younger.

References

Villages in Karmala taluka